Michael 'Bo' Kelly (born June 27, 1972) is a retired arena football player who was a fullback/linebacker in the Arena Football League (AFL) for twelve seasons during the 1990s and 2000s. Kelly played college football for East Texas State University. He played professionally for the Arizona Rattlers and Carolina Cobras of the AFL.

During his long professional career, he became the AFL's all-time rushing leader, breaking the record formerly held by Bob McMillen, (later broken by Derrick Ross in 2013) and played for one ArenaBowl-winning Arizona Rattler team.

Early life
Born in Overton, Texas, Kelly earned all-district honors at running back four times while starting both ways for West Rusk High School as well as lettering in basketball, track, and baseball.

College career
Kelly played at Cisco Junior College where he earned second-team All-Conference honors. After graduation from Cisco, Kelly became a second-team All-Conference selection in his senior season at East Texas State University, Kelly was second on the team in rushing, third in receiving, and second in scoring with six touchdowns as a fullback. Kelly earned Snow Bowl Most Valuable Player honors in 1994.

References

External links
AFL bio

1972 births
Living people
American football fullbacks
American football linebackers
Cisco Wranglers football players
Texas A&M–Commerce Lions football players
Arizona Rattlers players
Carolina Cobras players
People from Overton, Texas